Viktor Kelm (born 2 January 1997) is a Kyrgyz football forward playing for FC Alay.

Club career
Born in Kyrgyz capital Bishkek, he had played with FC Abdysh-Ata Kant in 2013, and then he was part of the team that finished second in the 2014 Kyrgyzstan League. After playing in January 2015 with Abdysh-Ata main team in the winter Kyrgyzstan League, as well as with team's U-21 side at a tournament in Kazakhstan, he subsequently stayed in the country and, in February 2015, he signed with Kazakhstan Premier League side FC Kairat. He spent much time while at Almaty playing with Kairat youth team.

Kelm played with Kyrgyz FC Kara-Balta in 2016. During summer 2016 he joined Serbian side FK Bežanija.

After his spell in Serbia, Kelm returned to Kyrgyzstan and joined FC Alay.

International career
Kelm had been member of the Kyrgyzstan U-17 team at tournaments during 2013 and 2014.

In 2014 as in 2015 Kelm had been member of Kyrgyzstan U-21 team.

In March 2015, he was called to Kyrgyzstan main national team by coach Aleksandr Krestinin for the friendly-game against Afghanistan.

He debuted for Kyrgyzstan in a friendly game against Turkmenistan played on October 11, 2016.

In 2016, being only 19, he had a full year regarding national teams; he had represented in same year Kyrgyz U-19, U-21, and debuted for the Kyrgyzstan A national team. He was then called up for the friendly matches on 6 and 11 October against Lebanon and Turkmenistan.

References

1997 births
Living people
People from Bishkek
Kyrgyzstan international footballers
Kyrgyzstani expatriate footballers
Kyrgyzstani expatriate sportspeople in Kazakhstan
Kyrgyzstani expatriate sportspeople in Serbia
FC Abdysh-Ata Kant players
FC Kara-Balta players
FC Kairat players
Expatriate footballers in Kazakhstan
FK Bežanija players
Expatriate footballers in Serbia
Association football forwards
Kyrgyzstani footballers
Kyrgyzstani people of German descent